The Hop River is a river that runs through Tolland County, Connecticut. The Hop River's marshy source is just southeast of Bolton Notch, Connecticut. There is a popular paddling route beginning where the Skungamaug River enters the Hop River just north of the Hendee Road bridge and ending at the Willimantic River. Most of this route consists of quick-water, but a few Class I and Class II whitewater areas exist.

The Hop River State Park Trail crosses the river twice and is parallel to the river for the majority of the river's length.

Crossings

See also
List of rivers of Connecticut

References

External links 
Connecticut Explorer's Guide Online paddling maps of the Hop River

Rivers of Tolland County, Connecticut
Rivers of Connecticut
Tributaries of the Thames River (Connecticut)